Alexander Sergeyevich Foliforov (born 8 March 1992) is a Russian professional racing cyclist, who last rode for UCI Professional Continental team . He was named in the start list for the 2016 Giro d'Italia, winning the individual time trial on Stage 15.

Major results

2012
 6th Overall Tour de Serbie
1st  Young rider classification
 10th Overall Toscana-Terra di Ciclismo
2013
 1st Stage 4 Grand Prix of Adygeya
 5th Road race, UEC European Under-23 Road Championships
 5th Overall Giro della Valle d'Aosta
 7th Trofeo Banca Popolare di Vicenza
2014
 1st Stage 4 Grand Prix of Adygeya
 2nd Trofeo PIVA
 4th Overall Tour de l'Avenir
 6th Overall Ronde de l'Isard
1st  Points classification
1st  Mountains classification
1st Stages 1 & 4
2015
 1st  Overall Grand Prix of Sochi
1st Stage 4 (ITT)
 2nd Grand Prix of Sochi Mayor
 10th Overall Tour of Slovenia
2016
 1st Stage 15 (ITT) Giro d'Italia
2017
 1st  Mountains classification, Tour of the Alps

Grand Tour general classification results timeline

References

External links
 
 

1992 births
Living people
Russian male cyclists
People from Kovrov
Russian Giro d'Italia stage winners
Sportspeople from Vladimir Oblast